Theuzi is a former ancient city and bishopric in Roman Africa and present Latin Catholic titular see.

Its modern location is unclear, but is believed to have been somewhere in present Tunisia.

History 
Aquae Novae was important enough in the Roman province of Africa Proconsularis to become one of the many suffragans of its capital Carthage's Metropolitan Archbishopric, but faded.

Titular see 
The diocese was nominally restored in 1933 as a titular bishopric (Teuzi in Curiate Italian).

It has had the following incumbents, all of the lowest (episcopal) rank :
 Jorge Solórzano Pérez (2000.06.17 – 2005.10.15)
 José Luis Mollaghan (1993.07.22 – 2000.05.17) as Auxiliary Bishop of Buenos Aires (Argentina) (1993.07.22 – 2000.05.17); later Bishop of San Miguel (Argentina) (2000.05.17 – 2005.12.22), Metropolitan Archbishop of Rosario (Argentina) (2005.12.22 – 2014.05.19), Member of College for the review of appeals by clergy accused of delicta graviora (2015.01.21 – ...)
 Antonio José López Castillo (1988.02.26 – 1992.08.01) as Auxiliary Bishop of Maracaibo (Venezuela) (1988.02.26 – 1992.08.01); later Bishop of Barinas (Venezuela) (1992.08.01 – 2001.12.27), Metropolitan Archbishop of Calabozo (Venezuela) (2001.12.27 – 2007.12.22), Metropolitan Archbishop of Barquisimeto (Venezuela) (2007.12.22 – ...)
 Eduardo Pedro Martínez y Dalmau, Passionists (C.P.) (1961.03.16 – 1987.11.19)
 Andrzej Siemieniewski (2006.01.05 – ...), Auxiliary Bishop of Wrocław (Poland)

Source and external links 
 GCatholic with titular incumbent biography links

Catholic titular sees in Africa
Former Roman Catholic dioceses in Africa